The Asia/Oceania Zone was one of the three zones of the regional Davis Cup competition in 1998.

In the Asia/Oceania Zone there were four different tiers, called groups, in which teams competed against each other to advance to the upper tier. Winners in Group I advanced to the World Group Qualifying Round, along with losing teams from the World Group first round. Teams who lost their respective ties competed in the relegation play-offs, with winning teams remaining in Group I, whereas teams who lost their play-offs were relegated to the Asia/Oceania Zone Group II in 1999.

Participating nations

Draw

 relegated to Group II in 1999.
 and  advance to World Group Qualifying Round.

First round

Uzbekistan vs. China

Japan vs. Indonesia

Lebanon vs. New Zealand

Second round

South Korea vs. Uzbekistan

Japan vs. New Zealand

First round relegation play-offs

South Korea vs. China

Lebanon vs. Indonesia

Second round relegation play-offs

China vs. Indonesia

References

External links
Davis Cup official website

Davis Cup Asia/Oceania Zone
Asia Oceania Zone Group I